Robert John Banks (born August 6, 1939) is an Australian Christian thinker, writer and practitioner. He is a biblical scholar, practical theologian and cultural critic, as well as an innovative educator and church planter.

Early life

Robert Banks was born in Sydney in 1939, raised and educated there, and studied arts/law at Sydney University. In 1959 he entered Moore Theological College and on graduating three years later married Julie Lonsdale Johnson. After ordination and ministry at Holy Trinity Anglican Church in Adelaide, he completed an MTh at King's College in the University of London and a PhD in New Testament on Jesus' attitude to the Law at Clare College Cambridge University. In 1969 he resigned from the Anglican Church on the grounds of its status distinction between clergy and laity, its ceremonial view of the sacraments and its over-emphasis on its members serving the institution and activities of the church rather than fulfilling their vocation in and witnessing to the world.

Returning to Australia in 1969, he was appointed as a Research Fellow in the History of Ideas Unit at the Australian National University, Canberra. During this time he helped develop several home-based congregations in the city, was also a theological consultant to people of faith in the Public Service and started a theological program for lay people. In 1974 he became Senior Lecturer in Ancient History at Macquarie University, Sydney. His publications during this time included books on early Christian idea of community, the tyranny of time, private values and public policy, and going to church in the first century.

Midlife

In 1989 he was invited to become Foundation Professor in The Ministry of the Laity at Fuller Theological Seminary, Los Angeles, where he introduced a Master of Arts in Christian Leadership for lay people and a Doctorate in Practical Theology. Three highlights of this period were helping to found a national Coalition for Ministry in Daily Life, serve on the Board of InterVarsity Fellowship's Marketplace Ministries and nurturing independent and denominational home-based congregations in Los Angeles and other parts of North America. In the mid-1990s he became the first Executive Director of the De Pree Leadership Center at Fuller Seminary, working among business, media and professional people as well as with church, para-church and missionary leaders.

His lifelong interest in film led to his becoming the first Director of an annual City of the Angels Film Festival, held annually at the Director's Guild in Los Angeles. This focussed on mainstream and independent films containing spiritual and moral themes. Along with books on the God as worker and re-envisioning theological education, he wrote and edited others on relating faith to work, leading with spirit, and Christianity in everyday life. Alongside being a Visiting Professor in theological institutions in Korea, Canada, Russia and Switzerland, he networked with facilitators of simpler, grassroots forms of christian gathering in a range of non-denominational, inter-denominational, and mainline denominational settings in overseas courses.

Later life

In early 1999 he returned to Australia where, shortly afterwards, his wife Julie died of a brain tumour. He then became the first Director and Dean of the Christian Studies Institute at Macquarie University, Sydney, which offered degree level courses to university students and professional development for Christians in the workplace. In late 2000 he married Linda Hope, who had been a Staff Worker for the Australian Fellowship of Evangelical Students and an Associate Pastor in a number of churches. In the following years he wrote books on everyday theology, religion in film, and apologetics. In 2004 a Festschrift was produced in his honour with contributions from fifteen scholars around the world, including Edwin Judge, John Drane, Miroslav Volf and James Dunn. In 2019, a special issue of the journal Zadok Perspectives, containing articles by a number of Australian christian thinkers was issued to celebrate his 80th birthday. He and Linda have also created several biblically-based resource materials for small groups, and written three books on the contribution of Australian women missionaries to the emergence of modern China, a country with which they have  developed a special bond arising from their grand-aunt's 30 years missionary service there. In China, Robert has spoken in seminaries, a university, and several times at the annual Bible in China Seminar sponsored by the Shanghai Academy of Social Sciences and United Bible Societies.
He presently holds a Visiting Professorship at Fuller Theological Seminary for whom he teaches courses overseas, is an Honorary Professor at Alphacrucis College, Sydney and Adjunct Research Professor at the Australian Centre for Christianity & Culture, Charles Sturt University in Canberra. In recent years he has addressed university and theological audiences, marketplace and non-profit organisations, organic and life-engaged churches, mixed religious and secular audiences, interested in the role of faith in contemporary society in Asia and Europe as well as Australia. Several of his books have been translated into Korean, Japanese, Portuguese, Danish, Chinese, Persian and German, and he has also won Book of the Year awards in Australia, Canada and the United States. He is a member of the Tyndale Fellowship for Biblical and Theological Research in England, the international Society for New Testament Studies and, with his wife Linda, the  Yale-Edinburgh
Group on the History of Missions and World Christianity, and the International Association of Missiological Studies

References

External links

Biblical Graduate School of Theology Adjunct Lecturers Page http://www.bgst.edu.sg/adjunct-lecturers/

IVP Press Author Page https://www.ivpress.com/cgi-ivpress/author.pl/author_id=457/

LibraryThing Author Page http://www.librarything.com/author/banksrobertj

Major publications

 Jesus and the Law in the Synoptic Tradition,  Cambridge University Press, Cambridge, 1975
 Paul's Idea of Community: The Early House Churches in Their Historical Setting, Anzea, Sydney; Paternoster, Exeter and Eerdmans, Grand Rapids, 1980, revised version by Hendricksen Press, 1994, 3rd edition, with new subtitle 'Spirit and Culture in Early House Churches', by Baker Press, 2020.
 Going to Church in the First Century, Hexagon Press, Sydney, 1980.
 The Tyranny of Time, Anzea, Sydney; Paternoster, Exeter; InterVarsity Press, Downer's Grove, 1983.
 Re-envisioning Theological Education: A Missional Approach to Ministry Formation, Grand Rapids: Eerdmans, 1999.
 All the Business of Life: Bringing Theology Down-To-Earth, Albatross, Sydney; Lion, Tring, 1987, revised and expanded as "Redeeming the Routines: Bringing Theology to Life", Grand Rapids: Baker, 1993.
 God the Worker: Journeys into the Mind, Heart, and Imagination of God, Sydney, Albatross, 1992; Valley Forge: Judson, 1994
 And Man Created God: Is God a Human Invention?, Tring: Lion Hudson/Kregel, 2010.
 Daily Work as Divine Vocation: A Christian Perspective, Singapore: Ethos Centre for Public Christianity, 2017.
 A Day in the Life of an Early Christian, Seoul: IVP Korea, 2018, 2nd ed. Albury: Studio, 2020. 
 Stepping Out in Mission under Caesar's Shadow, Seoul: IVP Korea, 2020.
 (with Julia Banks) The Home Church: Regrouping the People of God for Community and Mission, Sydney: Albatross (Tring:Lion), 1986, revised and republished by Hendricksen Press, 1998.
 (with Kim Powell), Faith in Leadership: Why it Matters and What Difference it Makes, San Francisco: Jossey-Bass, 2000.
 (with Michael Frost) Lessons from Reel Life: Movies, Meaning and Myth-Making, Open Book, 2001.
 (with Bernice Ledbetter) Reviewing Leadership: A Christian Evaluation of Current Approaches, Baker, 2004, revised and expanded edition (with also David Greenhalgh), 2016.
 Ed. Reconciliation and Hope: New Testament Essays on Atonement and Eschatology, Paternoster, Exeter and Eerdmans, Grand Rapids, 1974.
 Ed. Private Lives and Public Policy: The Ethics of Decision Making in Government Administration, Anzea, Sydney, 1983.
 Ed. (with R.Paul Stevens), The Complete Book of Everyday Christianity: An A-Z Guide to Following Christ in Every Aspect of Life, Dower's Grove: IVP, 1997. 
 Ed. (with Paul Stevens), Thoughtful Parenting: A Manual of Wisdom for Marriage and Family, Downer's Grove: InterVarsity Press, 2001.
 Ed. (with Paul Stevens), The Marketplace Ministry Handbook, Regent College, 2005.
 (with Linda Banks) View From the Faraway Pagoda: A Pioneer Australian Missionary in China from the Boxer Rebellion to the Communist Insurgency, Acorn, 2012
 (with Linda Banks) They Shall See His Face": The Story of Amy Oxley Wilkinson and her Visionary Blind School in China, Melbourne: Acorn, 2018; revised version Wipf & Stock, 2021. 
 (with Linda Banks) Through the Valley of the Shadow: Australian Women in War-Torn China, Eugene, OR: Wipf & Stock, 2019.
 (with Linda Banks) Children of the Massacre: The Extraordinary Story of the Stewart Family in Hong Kong and West China, Eugene: Wipf and Stock, 2021.

Australian Christian theologians
1939 births
20th-century Christian biblical scholars
21st-century Christian biblical scholars
Anglican biblical scholars
Living people
Australian biblical scholars
Alumni of Clare College, Cambridge
People from Sydney
University of Sydney alumni
Moore Theological College alumni
Alumni of the University of London
Academic staff of Macquarie University
Fuller Theological Seminary faculty